Charles Franklin Keffer was a major league baseball player who played during the late 19th century.  He was a pitcher for the Syracuse Stars of the American Association in April and May 1890, appearing in two games.

External links

Major League Baseball pitchers
Baseball players from Pennsylvania
Syracuse Stars (AA) players
1861 births
19th-century baseball players
Altoona Mountain Cities players
Lewiston Independents players
Wilkes-Barre Coal Barons players
Year of death missing